Merit may refer to:

Religion
 Merit (Christianity) 
 Merit (Buddhism)
 Punya (Hinduism)
 Imputed righteousness in Reformed Christianity

Companies and brands
 Merit (cigarette), a brand of cigarettes made by Altria
 Merit Energy Company, an international energy company
 Merit Motion Pictures, a production company based in Winnipeg, Manitoba, Canada
 Merit Network
 Merit (TV channel), a UK television channel owned by Sky Group
 Merit, a trading name used by J & L Randall
 A chain of gas stations owned by Meadville Corporation before it was purchased by  Hess Corporation in 2000.

Music
 Merit (indie rock band), a band from Syracuse, New York

Schools
 Merit School of Music, a music education organization in Chicago, Illinois, United States
 Merit Academy, a high school in Springville, Utah, United States

Other uses
 Figure of merit
 Merit (law)
 Merit, Texas, an unincorporated community in Hunt County, Texas, United States
 Merit of the prime gap gn, the ratio of gn / log(pn)
 MERITS an international train timetable database.

People with the name
 Merit Janow, American professor
 Merit or Meryt, an ancient Egyptian feminine name, from the Egyptian language meaning "beloved":
 Merit, an ancient Egyptian woman of the middle Eighteenth Dynasty, wife of the royal scribe and architect Kha; joint owner with her husband of the intact tomb TT8
 Merit (wife of Maya), an ancient Egyptian woman of the late Eighteenth Dynasty,  wife of the royal treasurer Maya

See also
 Demerit (disambiguation)
 Merit badge (Boy Scouts of America)
 Merit good, a commodity which is judged that an individual or society should have on the basis of need
 Merit pay
 Meritocracy
 Meritt (disambiguation)
 Merrit (disambiguation)
 Merritt (disambiguation)
 
 

de:Merit